Aristosyrphus is a genus of Neotropical hoverflies.

Species
The genus contains 15 species, divided into two subgenera Aristosyrphus and Eurypterosyrphus Barretto & Lane, 1947:

Subgenus Aristosyrphus
A. barrettoi Thompson, 2008 – Brazil (Goias)
A. bellus Marinoni, 2008 – Brazil (Amazonas)
A. boraceiensis (Papavero, 1962)
A. brunneus Thompson, 2008 – Costa Rica & Brazil (São Paulo)
A. carpenteri (Hull, 1945)
A. elegans Thompson, 2008 – Brazil (Roraima)
A. elongatus Hull, 1943
A. fortuitus Ramirez, 2008 – Mexico (Jalisco)
A. minutus Thompson, 2004
A. obscurus Thompson, 2008 – Brazil (Santa Catarina)
A. primus Curran, 1941
A. samperi Thompson, 2008 – Colombia, Peru & Costa Rica

Subgenus Eurypterosyrphus
A. currani (Goot, 1964)
A. macropterus (Curran, 1941)
A. melanopterus Barretto & Lane, 1947

References

Hoverfly genera
Taxa named by Charles Howard Curran
Microdontinae